This is a list of notable British Iranians.

Academics 

 Haleh Afshar OBE university professor at the University of York
 Kameel Ahmady independent multi-award winning social anthropologist who researches and publishes on female genital mutilation, child marriage and other aspects of children's and women's rights in the Middle East
 Ali Ansari university professor at the University of St Andrews
 Reza Banakar professor of socio-legal studies at the University of Westminster, London
 Ana Diamond scholar at Balliol College, Oxford
 Abbas Edalat university professor at Imperial College London
 Anoush Ehteshami university professor at Durham University
 Eprime Eshag Keynesian socialist economist
 Rouben Galichian independent scholar
 Mohammed Ghanbari university professor at the University of Essex
 Homa Katouzian academic, economist, historian and literary critic
 Ali Mobasheri associate professor and reader at the University of Nottingham
 Mohammad Hashem Pesaranacademic, economist, professor of economics at Cambridge University, fellow of Trinity College, Cambridge
 Saeed Vaseghi university professor at Brunel University
 Taha Yasseri university professor at University of Oxford

Actors and comedians 

 Freema Agyeman actress
 Zahra Ahmadi actress
 Catherine Bell actress
 Nazanin Boniadi actress; played Leyla Mir on General Hospital and CIA analyst Fara Sherazi on Homeland season 3
 Bijan Daneshmand – Iranian actor based in London
 Omid Djalili comedian and actor
 Leila Farzad – actress
 Davood Ghadami  British Iranian actor, known for EastEnders character Kush Kazemi
 Shaheen Jafargholi  Welsh Iranian singer and actor; appeared on Britain's Got Talent
 Mandana Jones actress
 Hadi Khorsandi comedian
 Shappi Khorsandi comedian
 Kayvan Novak actor; star of Fonejacker
 Roxanne Pallet actress
 Roxy Shahidi actress
 Darren Shahlavi  British actor, martial arts stuntman
 Hayley Tamaddon actress

Art and architecture 

 Nasser Golzari principal at Golzari (NG) Architects
 Mouzhan Majidi chief executive officer of Foster and Partners
 Mohsen Mostafavi dean of the Harvard Graduate School of Design
 Farshid Moussavi architect and founder of Foreign Office Architects
 Afshin Naghouni artist
 Kour Pour artist
Houmayoun Mahmoudi artist, International cartoonist 
 Alireza Sagharchi principal at Stanhope Gate Architecture

Business 

 Kaveh Alamouti head of Global Macro Citadel LLC; chief executive officer of Citadel Asset Management Europe
 David Alliance, Baron Alliance, GBE chairman of N Brown Group
 Farad Azima industrialist, inventor and philanthropist
 Camila Batmanghelidjhfounder of failed charity Kids Company
 Darius Guppy convicted fraudster, writer
 Bobby Hashemi co-founder of Coffee Republic
 Sahar Hashemi co-founder of Coffee Republic
 Kia Joorabchian football businessman
 Nasser David Khalili, KSS art dealer and the fifth-wealthiest person in the United Kingdom
 Mahmoud Khayami, KSS industrialist; founder of Iran Khodro
 James Aratoon Malcolm – Iranian-Armenian financier, arms dealer and journalist
 Paris Moayedi former chief executive officer of Jarvis plc
 Farhad Moshiri energy investor; part owner of Everton F.C.
 Ali Parsa former chief executive officer of private healthcare partnership Circle
 Eddy Shah owner of the Messenger Group
 Yasmina Siadatan winner of fifth series of The Apprentice
 Amir Taaki computer programmer and bitcoin developer
 Robert and Vincent Tchenguiz brothers who own the Rotch property group
 Sir Hossein Yassaie Phd  Chief Executive Office of semiconductor company Imagination Technologies
 Dan Vahdat co-founder and CTO of Medopad

Entertainment 

 Cameron Alborzian former model
 Cyrus Bayandor bass guitarist (Florence + the Machine)
 Darius Campbell (formerly Danesh) actor and singer-songwriter
 Emun Elliott actor
 Hichkas rapper, singer-songwriter
 Shirin Guild fashion designer
 Shusha Guppy writer and singer
 Shaheen Jafargholi singer; Britain's Got Talent series 3  contestant
 Yasmin Le Bon model
 Patrick Monahan stand-up comedian
 Kayvan Novak actor; appeared as Waj in the film Four Lions (2010)
 Omid 16B disc jockey
  Roxanne Tataei  soul singer-songwriter
 Eddy Temple-MorrisXFM disc jockey
 Kavus Torabi musician
 Yasmin musician, full name Yasmin Shahmir
 Sami Yusuf musician
 Zarif musician

Media 

 Hossein Amini screenwriter and film director
 Behrouz Afagh head of BBC World Service's Asia Pacific Region
 Christiane Amanpour, CBE journalist
 Nazenin Ansari  journalist, former correspondent for Voice of America's Persian News Network
 Saeed Kamali Dehghan staff journalist at The Guardian
 Fardad Farahzad Journalist and TV host Iran International, former BBC Persian
 Nazaneen Ghaffar weather presenter at Sky News
 Tina Gharavi filmmaker and screenwriter
 Kaveh Golestan photojournalist
 Baqer Moin BBC News journalist
 Maryam Moshiri BBC News presenter
 Ramita Navai journalist
 Nima Nourizadeh film director
 Sadeq Saba journalist, head of BBC Persian service
 Benjamin Zand BBC News reporter
 Sahar Zand television and radio presenter, broadcast journalist and documentary maker

Politics 
 Seema Kennedy former Conservative MP
 Ali Milani Labour Party politician
 Maryam Namazie human-rights activist, commentator and broadcaster

Sports 

 Adam Gemili  sprinter and footballer
 Aadel Kardooni former Leicester Tigers and England A rugby player
 Nad Narimani  mixed martial artist in the UFC
 Josh Navidi Cardiff Blues and Welsh international rugby player
 Kamran Panjavi weightlifter at the 2004 Summer Olympics
 Laurence Shahlaei strongman
 Kamal Shalorus professional UFC fighter
 Ryan Tafazolli footballer
 Mehrdad Takaloo boxer
 Dennis Walker footballer of Afro-Iranian descent, first black player to play for Manchester United

Other 

 Yasha Asley youngest person in the world to have achieved grade A at Mathematics A-level
 Ali Dizaei senior police officer
 Shirazeh Houshiary Turner Prize-nominated installation artist and sculptor
 Mansour Matloubi poker player
 Behnaz Mozakka terrorism victim
 Ben Roberts poker player

See also 

British Iranians
List of Iranians
List of Iranian Americans

References 

 
Iranians
British
Iranians
British